John William "Bobadil" Hooper (17 March 1878 – 13 August 1928) was an Australian rules footballer who played with Carlton in the Victorian Football League (VFL). He played 15 games with the Carlton team in 1899. His nickname is said to have come from Ben Jonson's writing "Every Man in His Humour."

Notes

External links 

Australian rules footballers from Victoria (Australia)
Carlton Football Club players
1878 births
1928 deaths
West Melbourne Football Club players